Albert J. Sloan–Alumni Stadium is a stadium in Fairfield, Alabama.  It is primarily used for American football, and is the home field of Miles College. 

American football venues in Alabama
College football venues
College sports in Alabama
Miles Golden Bears football
Tourist attractions in Jefferson County, Alabama